The following lists events that happened in 1958 in Iceland.

Incumbents
President – Ásgeir Ásgeirsson
Prime Minister – Hermann Jónasson, Emil Jónsson

Events

Births

23 April – Hilmar Örn Hilmarsson, musician and art director
22 July – Sævar Jónsson, footballer
28 July – Pétur Ormslev, footballer
30 August – Sigrún Edda Björnsdóttir, actress and writer
8 September – Ólína Þorvarðardóttir, politician.
9 September – Páll Guðlaugsson, footballer

Full date missing
Ragnar Th. Sigurdsson, photographer

Deaths

5 April – Ásgrímur Jónsson, painter (b. 1876)

References

 
1950s in Iceland
Iceland
Iceland
Years of the 20th century in Iceland